Turtle was a free anonymous peer-to-peer network project being developed at the Vrije Universiteit in Amsterdam, involving professor Andrew Tanenbaum. It is not developed anymore. Like other anonymous P2P software, it allows users to share files and otherwise communicate without fear of legal sanctions or censorship. Turtle's claims of anonymity are backed by two research papers provided in the "external links" below.

Architecture
Technically, Turtle is a friend-to-friend (F2F) network - a special type of peer-to-peer network in which all your communication goes only to your friends, and then to their friends, and so on, to the ultimate destination.

The basic idea behind Turtle is to build a P2P overlay on top of pre-existing trust relationships among Turtle users. Each user acts as node in the overlay by running a copy of the Turtle client software. Unlike existing P2P networks, Turtle does not allow arbitrary nodes to connect and exchange information. Instead, each user establishes secure and authenticated channels with a limited number of other nodes controlled by trusted people (friends).

In the Turtle overlay, both queries and results move hop by hop; the net result is that information is only exchanged between people that trust each other and is always encrypted. Consequently, a snooper or adversary has no way to determine who is requesting / providing information, and what that information is. Given this design, a Turtle network offers a number of useful security properties, such as confined damage in case of node compromise, and resilience against denial of service attacks.

See also 

giFT
Internet privacy
File sharing
F2F
RetroShare (inspired by "Turtle Hopping" feature)

External links
 Turtle homepage (student's project, 2004)
 Petr Matejka's master thesis on Turtle (2004)
 "Safe and Private Data Sharing with Turtle: Friends Team-Up and Beat the System"
 "Turtle: Safe and Private Data Sharing" from Usenix 2005 conference
 Turtle is also cited by this article  from the "Applied Public Key Infrastructure: 4th International Workshop: Iwap 2005" and by this article  from the "11th International Conference on Parallel and Distributed Systems (ICPADS'05) "

Anonymity networks
Internet privacy software
File sharing networks
File sharing software
Free routing software
Free network-related software
Free software programmed in C++